Captain Duncan Mackellar was a sea captain and, subsequently, a colonial settler of New South Wales, Australia, with his nephew, Duncan Mackellar, Junior  (1795—1838). Both are associated with the early days of Braidwood. 

He was born around 1789, in the parish of Kilmodan, Scotland. Known as Duncan Mackellar of Glendaruel, he was recognised as the head of the Mackellar clan. The life of the clans had been suppressed, after the Jacobite rising and the Act of Proscription 1746, and like other Scots, Mackellar had to find a career. He became a sea captain. In 1812, his ship was captured by the French and taken to Brest. Mackellar and his crew overpowered the prize crew holding the ship, and escaped with their ship to England. He married Margaret Dick (b. 1794), in 1814. They had five children. 

In 1822, he visited Sydney in command of Clydesdale, a ship sailing under the licence of the East India Company. It is possible that around this time he committed to settling in the colony, and may have received a land grant.

In 1825, he was captain of the ship City of Edinburgh, owned by The Australian Company, of Edinburgh and Leith, in Scotland. The company's ships operated between Britain and the colony of New South Wales. On that ship in 1825, as immigrant passengers, were Mackellar's nephew, Duncan Mackellar, Junior and his nephew's family.  

Mackellar resigned and stayed in the colony as a settler. in 1828, during the administration of Governor Darling. Darling tended to favour like-minded military men, both to staff his administration and as settlers given grants of land. He was immediately a supporter of Darling—aligned with the faction of colonists known as 'the Exclusives'—against those—'the Emancipists' and 'the Emigrants'—making allegations of nepotism and cronyism against  Darling's administration.

Mackellar took up, with his nephew, Duncan Mackellar, Junior, a combined total of 3250 acres of land, near what is now the town of Braidwood, in 1829. By 1830, he had £1,000 capital, a stone house, a wood slab house, several huts, 12 assigned convicts and two free servants, with 120 acres cleared and the property was stocked with sheep, cattle and horses.

His holding was known as 'Strathalan'. He also had the right to graze on another 6000 acres of adjacent land that had not been granted or sold yet, in return for a rental payment. He then purchased 4000 acres, probably some of the adjacent land that he had been renting. In 1835, he was applying to buy nearby land, near his nephew's land grant, west of the Shoalhaven River, at Bombay.

In 1833, as a prominent citizen of the district, he was appointed a magistrate.

By 1837, the large landholders, 'the Exclusives', were facing the likelihood  that transportation of convicts to New South wales would end, taking with it their source of low-cost labour. The large landholders advocated immigration of 'coolies', from India or China, to provide low-cost labour to replace the convicts. Mackellar gave evidence to a committee of the Legislative Council enquiring into immigration of Indians, in June 1837. The 'Exclusives' envisaged, in effect, a plantation-style economy, using lowly-paid, non-white indentured menial labourers—later attempting to import such 'coolies'—or convicts.  Other colonists, who were aiming to achieve colonial self-government, opposed such an economic system.  

Considerations of the availability of cheap labour had become academic to Mackellar. He had sold his landholding—likely at great profit—in 1836, to another sea captain who became a settler, Captain John Coghill, former captain of an East India Company convict transport ship, Mangles, who later built 'Bedervale'''.   

He returned to Scotland, in 1837, and was living there, in 1839, when he published An Emigrant's Guide to Australia''; it sets out his experience of farming in New South Wales. In it, he claimed that his £3500 capital invested in sheep had grown to £24,000, in eight years. When Mackellar died is unclear. His nephew died in 1838, and his nephew's landholding was held in trust for his three sons.  

Although he did not remain there long, he is remembered as one of the first colonial settlers of the district around Braidwood. He is remembered by Mackellar Street and Duncan Street in Braidwood which has its streets named for early settlers. That there are two such streets suggests that the street names also commemorate his identically-named nephew.

See also 

 History of Braidwood, New South Wales

References

Settlers of New South Wales
Scottish emigrants to Australia